is a 1967 Japanese kaiju film directed by Jun Fukuda, with special effects by Sadamasa Arikawa, under the supervision of Eiji Tsuburaya. Produced and distributed by Toho Co., Ltd, it is the eighth film in the Godzilla franchise. It stars Tadao Takashima, Akira Kubo, Akihiko Hirata, and Beverly Maeda, with Hiroshi Sekita, Seiji Onaka, and Haruo Nakajima as Godzilla, and Marchan the Dwarf as Minilla.

Son of Godzilla received a theatrical release in Japan on December 16, 1967, and was released directly to television in the United States in 1969 through the Walter Reade Organization.

Plot
A team of scientists are trying to perfect a weather-controlling system. Their efforts are hampered by the arrival of a nosy reporter and by the sudden presence of  giant praying mantises. The first test of the weather control system goes awry when the remote control for a radioactive balloon is jammed by an unexplained signal coming from the center of the island. The balloon detonates prematurely, creating a radioactive storm that causes the giant mantises to grow to enormous sizes. Investigating the mantises, which are named Kamacuras (Gimantis in the English-dubbed version), the scientists find the monstrous insects digging an egg out from under a pile of earth. The egg hatches, revealing a baby Godzilla. The scientists realize that the baby's telepathic cries for help were the cause of the interference that ruined their experiment. Shortly afterwards, Godzilla arrives on the island in response to the infant's cries, demolishing the scientist's base while rushing to defend the baby. Godzilla kills two of the Kamacuras during the battle while one manages to fly away to safety, Godzilla then adopts the baby.

The baby Godzilla, named Minilla, quickly grows to about half the size of the adult Godzilla and Godzilla instructs it on the important monster skills of roaring and using its atomic ray. At first, Minilla has difficulty producing anything more than atomic smoke rings, but Godzilla discovers that stressful conditions (i.e. stomping on his tail) or motivation produces a true radioactive blast. Minilla comes to the aid of Saeko when she is attacked by a Kamacuras, but inadvertently awakens Kumonga (Spiga in the English-dubbed version), a giant spider that was sleeping in a valley. Kumonga attacks the caves where the scientists are hiding and Minilla stumbles into the fray.

Kumonga traps Minilla and the final Kamacuras with its webbing, but as Kumonga begins to feed on the deceased Kamacuras, Godzilla arrives. Godzilla saves Minilla and they work together to defeat Kumonga by using their atomic rays on the giant spider. Hoping to keep the monsters from interfering in their attempt to escape the island, the scientists finally use their perfected weather altering device on the island and the once tropical island becomes buried in snow and ice. As the scientists are saved by an American submarine, Godzilla and Minilla begin to hibernate as they wait for the island to become tropical again.

Cast

Production

Writing
For the second Godzilla film in a row, Toho produced an island themed adventure with a smaller budget than most of their monster films from this time period. While the a-list crew of talent was hired to work on that year's King Kong Escapes, (Ishirō Honda, Eiji Tsuburaya, and Akira Ifukube), the second string crew of cheaper talent was once again tapped to work on this project as they had done with Ebirah, Horror of the Deep. This included Jun Fukuda (director), Sadamasa Arikawa (special effects), and Masaru Sato (composer).  This was the first film where Arikawa was officially listed as the director of Special Effects, although he did receive some supervision from Tsuburaya when he was available.

Son of Godzilla was the first Godzilla film to feature a female writer. Kazue Shiba collaborated with Shinichi Sekizawa on the film's screenplay. The early draft of the film, done by Kazue Shiba, titled Two Godzilla's: Japan S.O.S. (2つのゴジラ：日本S.O.S.!, Gojira: Tsu no Nihon S.O.S.!). The overall plot is the same but Kumonga and the Kamacuras are not in the story.

Filming
Filming took place in Guam and areas in Japan including Gotemba, Lake Yamana, the Fuji Five Lakes region, and Oshima.

Toho wanted to create a baby Godzilla to appeal to the "date crowd" (a genre of films that were very popular among young couples during this time period), with the idea that girls would like a "cute" baby monster. For the idea behind Minilla, Fukuda stated, "We wanted to take a new approach, so we gave Godzilla a child. We thought it would be a little strange if we gave Godzilla a daughter, so instead we gave him a son". Fukuda also wanted to portray the monsters almost as people in regards to the father-son relationship between Godzilla and Minilla, as Fukuda stated "We focused on the relationship between Godzilla and his son throughout the course of Son of Godzilla.

At the time, Sekizawa was already tired of writing the series and likely complained that he had run out of ideas for further monster movies, and director Jun Fukuda heartily agreed. Producer Tomoyuki Tanaka then proposed the idea of introducing a son to Godzilla.

The budget for the film was 260,000,000 yen. When Son of Godzilla was released on December 16, 1967 in Japan, it sold 2,480,000 tickets. When the film was re-issued on August 1, 1973, it received 610,000 attendees, adding up to a rough attendance total of 3,090,000.

Special effects
The Godzilla suit built for this film was the biggest in terms of size and girth.  This was done in order to give Godzilla a "maternal" appearance and to give a parent-like stature in contrast next to Minilla. Because of the size of the suit, seasoned Godzilla suit actor Haruo Nakajima was only hired to play Godzilla in two scenes because the suit was much too big for him to wear. The smaller suit he had worn for the films Ebirah, Horror of the Deep and Invasion of Astro-Monster was used for these sequences. The much larger Seji Onaka instead played Godzilla in the film, although he was replaced midway through filming by Hiroshi Sekita after he broke his fingers.

Minilla was designed to incorporate features of not only a baby Godzilla but a human baby was well. Minilla's face was patterned after the character Chibita from the popular manga Osomatsu-kun published by Shogakukan in Weekly Shonen Saturday at the time. "Marchan the Dwarf" was hired to play the character due to his ability to play-act and to give the character a childlike ambiance. He was also hired because of his ability to perform athletic rolls and flips inside the thick rubber suit.

Outside of the two monster suits, various marionettes and puppets were used to portray the Island's gigantic inhabitants. The various giant preying mantises known as Kamacuras and the huge spider Kumonga. Arikawa would usually have 20 puppeteers at a time working on the various marionettes. The massive Kumonga puppet needed 2 to 3 people at a time to operate each leg.

Styrofoam and paraffin were used for the snow falling on Solgell Island.

Deleted scenes
Many scenes were shot but deleted showing Godzilla being mean or harsh to Minilla. One sequence shows Godzilla leaving Minilla behind on the freezing Sollgel Island and making it to shore before turning back was cut from the final film's ending. A portion of this sequence has been preserved in both the trailer and an outtake reel included with the Godzilla Final Box DVD collection as supplemental material. More deleted footage included Godzilla expecting the newborn Minilla to get up and walk after the Kamacuras have been defeated. Another featured Godzilla head-butting Minilla to make him stop following Saeko. One scene included Minilla being able to fire his own type of atomic breath during his fight with Kamacuras. However, in the final film, the smoke rings and his Godzilla breath were utilized instead. It is unknown who was responsible for these bits being deleted, but it was possibly Tsuburaya since he would not have allowed time and resources to be wasted shooting each such scenes if he was not okay with them in the first place.

Release

Theatrical 
Son of Godzilla was distributed theatrically in Japan by Toho on December 16, 1967. The film was released theatrically in the United Kingdom in August 1969, as a double feature with Ebirah, Horror of the Deep. Son of Godzilla was never released theatrically in the United States, instead being released directly to television by Walter Reade Sterling as well as American International Pictures (AIP-TV) in some markets in 1969. The American television version was cut to 84 minutes.

Home media
In 2005, the film was released on DVD by Sony Pictures in its original uncut length with the original Japanese audio and Toho's international English dub. In 2019, the Japanese version and export English version was included in a Blu-ray box set released by the Criterion Collection, which included all 15 films from the franchise's Shōwa era.

Reception
In a contemporary review, the Monthly Film Bulletin declared the film to be "out of the top drawer of the Toho Company's monster file, with the special effects department achieving their best results in monster locomotion" and that the film "has the advantage of a more soundly constructed story than most of its predecessors and a delightful vein of humor that allows for a gentle parody of the genre."

According to the Polish writer Aleksandra Ziółkowska-Boehm, the film appealed to Polish journalist Melchior Wańkowicz: "On August 9, Tomuś's birthday, we all went to see Son of Godzilla. I was afraid [Melchior] would be irritated by this film's type. I was again surprised, I watched with what interest he looked at the picture. Later he said that he had never seen this genre, but he was delighted with the technique of realization."

See also
 List of Japanese films of 1967
 List of science fiction films of the 1960s

References 
Footnotes

Bibliography

External links

 Godzilla on the web(Japan)
 
 
 

1967 films
1960s monster movies
1960s science fiction films
1960s children's fantasy films
Films scored by Masaru Sato
Films about insects
Films about spiders
Films directed by Jun Fukuda
Films dubbed by Frontier Enterprises
Films produced by Tomoyuki Tanaka
Films set on fictional islands
Films shot in Guam
Films shot in Japan
Giant monster films
Godzilla films
1960s Japanese-language films
Japanese children's films
Japanese fantasy films
Japanese sequel films
Kaiju films
Toho films
Films with screenplays by Shinichi Sekizawa
Films about father–son relationships
1960s Japanese films